Tom Cullberg is an artist born in Stockholm, Sweden, in 1972. He currently lives and works in Cape Town, South Africa.

Biography
Swedish born South African artist Tom Cullberg came to South Africa in 1993 to study towards his BA(FA) at the Michaelis School of Fine Art, graduating in 1997. He has been working prolifically ever since, with seventeen solo exhibitions to his name as well as inclusion in many significant group exhibitions. His work has been shown both locally and internationally at galleries such as Galleri Flach, Stockholm, (2016) BRUNDYN + GONSALVES, Cape Town (2012), SCOPE Art Show, New York City (2012), the Joburg Art Fair in Johannesburg (2011), Stevenson in Cape Town (2009), the Goodman Gallery in Cape Town, Magrorocca Galleria d'arte in Milan (2007) and Galleri Svenska Bilder in Stockholm (2003). His work is held in private, public and corporate collections including Swedish Parliament, Hollard, Karolinska Sjukhuset, Sasol, Spier, Nandos (UK) and the South African National Gallery.

Work
The paintings of Cullberg are at once familiar and foreign, pensive and playful. Charting territories between seemingly tangible and intangible worlds, the artist presents us with collections of represented objects that explore both fictitious story telling as well as real or recorded histories. These signifiers or symbols, appearing as though from dreams, hover or float over abstract grounds that, like the mechanics of memory appear in a state of flux. With humour and seriousness his paintings consider processes of association and recognition in the reading of both private and public narratives.

Exhibitions

Solo exhibitions
2018  Finding New Life in an Old Form, Barnard Gallery, Cape Town
2016  Good Advice, M Contemporary, Sydney, Australia
2016  Whatever Happens, Galleri Flach, Stockholm, Sweden
2014  Tower, Brundyn, Cape Town
2013   KKNK, Oudtshoorn
2013	Tom Cullberg: New Paintings, Candyland, Stockholm, Sweden
2012	SCOPE New York, New York, USA
2012	Periphery, BRUNDYN + GONSALVES, Cape Town
2008 	Small Moments, Joao Ferreira Gallery, Cape Town
2007 	Tom Cullberg, Magrorocca, Milan, Italy
2006 	House, Joao Ferreira Gallery, Cape Town
2006	House, KZNSA, Durban
2005 	The Judge and other stories, Joao Ferreira Gallery, Cape Town
2004 	There is so much to say, Joao Ferreira Gallery, Cape Town
2003 	Galleri Svenska Bilder, Stockholm, Sweden 
2002 	Principles of Flight, Joao Ferreira Gallery, Cape Town
2000 	In Between North and South, Joao Ferreira Gallery, Cape Town

Selected group exhibitions
2018   Barnard Collective, Barnard Gallery, Cape Town
2018   AKAA Art Fair, Paris, France
2018   Investec Cape Town Art Fair, Barnard Gallery, Cape Town
2017   Barnard Collective, Barnard Gallery, Cape Town
2016   Summer Exhibition, Circa, London, United Kingdom
2015  Homage, Everard Read, Cape Town
2014   Cape Town Art Fair, Cape Town     
2013   Paint+, NIROX, Johannesburg
2013   FNB Joburg Artfair, Johannesburg
2013   More Than Words, Spier Manor House, Stellenbosch
2013	Material/Representation, BRUNDYN + GONSALVES, Cape Town
2012	Contemporary mosaic works, Spier, Cape Town
2011	FNB Joburg Art Fair, BRUNDYN + GONSALVES, Cape Town
2010 	Open End, Goodman Gallery Cape, Cape Town
2009 	Summer 2009/10: Projects, Michael Stevenson, Cape Town
2009	Sing Into My Mouth, What if the World, Cape Town
2009	FNB Joburg Art Fair, Johannesburg
2009	Printing Money, The South African Print Gallery, Cape Town
2009	Big Wednesday’, What if the World, Cape Town
2008 	Warren Editions, Blank Projects, Cape Town
2008	Joburg Art Fair, Johannesburg 
2006 	New Painting, curated by Storm Janse van Rensburg; KZNSA, Durban; UNISA Gallery, Pretoria; Johannesburg Art Gallery, Johannesburg
1998 	Dreams and Clouds,  Kulturhuset, Stockholm, Sweden and Goteborgs Konst Museum, Gothenburg, Sweden
1998	Transposition Workshop Residency, Robben Island, hosted by South African National Gallery, Cape Town; Moderna Museet, Sweden
1997/8 The 2nd Johannesburg Biennale (with the Sluice Group), The South African National Gallery, Cape Town
1996 	Sluice: an Installation and Performance Event, Castle of Good Hope, Cape Town

External links
Official website
Artist page at BRUNDYN + GONSALVES
Full Artist CV

References

Swedish emigrants to South Africa
South African artists
Swedish artists
1972 births
Michaelis School of Fine Art alumni
Living people